N. S. Chandra Bose MBBS, FCGP, FIAMS was the President of the Indian Medical Association from 1991 to 1992 and former President of the Tamil Nadu State Bharatiya Janata Party from 1993 to 1995.

Bose was educated at Kasturba Medical College, Manipal and began practicing Medicine in Thoothukudi, Tamil Nadu in 1962.

References

1932 births
2010 deaths
Bharatiya Janata Party politicians from Tamil Nadu
Manipal Academy of Higher Education alumni